Seema is a Pakistani film directed by S.A. Bukhari. The story writer was Anwar Batalvi and the cinematographer was Raza Mir. The film stars Shamim Ara in the titular role, as a headstrong and possessive lover. It also stars Satosh Kumar, Sultan, Talish and Panna. The music was composed by Master Inayat Hussain.

Plot 
Seema's father is a heart patient and he decides to marry her with his cardiologist, Masood. Seema who loves Shahid, the famous poet of the country does not want to marry him on his father's wish. Due to her love for him, she succeedes to marry him. Her possessiveness towards Shahid usually creates problems between her and Shahid. After her pregnancy, Shahid goes to a lonely place to complete the collection of his poetry, to which she thinks that he has gone leaving her behind forever. But after a few days, on his arrival she argues with him and leaves for Masood to asks for aborting her unborn. She goes to Masood's house who tries to convince her to not to abort. He goes to drop her off at her house where Shahid gets caught with an accident due to fire in the house.

Cast 

 Shamim Ara as Seema
 Santosh Kumar
 Sultan
 Talish
 Panna
 Asad Jafri
 Sikandar
 Emi Menuwala
 Nighat Sultana (cameo)

Music

Awards 

At annual Nigar Awards, the film won two awards.

References 

Pakistani black-and-white films
1960s Urdu-language films
Urdu-language Pakistani films